Western Village is a hotel and casino located in Sparks, Nevada. It is owned and operated by Peppermill Casinos, Inc.

References

External links
 

1983 establishments in Nevada
Casinos completed in 1983
Casinos in Sparks, Nevada
Hotels established in 1983
Hotels in Sparks, Nevada
Resorts in Nevada
Casino hotels